Geologist may refer to:

Geologist, a contributor to the science of geology
Geologist (musician), a member of Animal Collective